Steven Marion Bieda (born January 21, 1961) is an American politician and member of the Democratic Party who is the Assistant Democratic Floor Leader of the Michigan State Senate.

Bieda has served in the Michigan Senate since 2011, representing the 9th district, which includes the communities of Center Line, Eastpointe, Fraser, Roseville, Warren, and portions of Clinton Township and Grosse Pointe Shores.

In December 2017, Bieda announced he would seek election to the U.S. House of Representatives in 2018, representing Michigan's 9th Congressional District. He ultimately lost the nomination to now incumbent representative Andy Levin.

Early life, education, and career 
Bieda was raised in Warren, Michigan, and attended Cousino High School.

He received his bachelor's degree and Masters in Public Administration from Wayne State University, and later earned a Juris Doctor from the University of Detroit Mercy School of Law as well as a Master of Laws in taxation from Wayne State University Law School.

Before seeking public office, Bieda worked as the Director of Labor Relations for the City of Warren, and as a Senior Policy Analyst for the Michigan House of Representatives.

Michigan House of Representatives 
In 2002, Bieda was elected to the Michigan House of Representatives for the 25th District.

His first term as State Representative, Bieda voted against a 2004 measure banning same-sex marriage in Michigan, which caused pundits to rank him as one of the three most vulnerable members of the House.

He went on to be re-elected in 2004 and 2006.

Michigan State Senate 
Bieda was elected to the Michigan State Senate in November 2010, and was re-elected in November 2014.

Bieda has sponsored and passed more than 50 bills and public acts, in addition to co-sponsoring hundreds of others, as he's served in both the majority and minority during his tenure.

In Lansing, Bieda is known as a "policy wonk" and is noted to have "an ability to work with Republicans in the legislature; he finally got them to pass a law to pay compensation to innocent people who were wrongly convicted and imprisoned."

Governor Whitmer appointed Mr. Bieda as Chairman of the Michigan Tax Tribunal within the Department of Licensing and Regulatory Affairs.

Personal life 

Bieda designed the reverse side of the U.S. Olympic Half Dollar that was issued in 1992. His design is an image of the Olympic torch and an olive branch. The inscriptions above and below read "United States of America" and "Half Dollar". A central inscription reads "Citius Altius Fortius" which is Latin for "Faster, Higher, Stronger".

Electoral history

References

External links
 Official website

1961 births
21st-century American politicians
Living people
Democratic Party members of the Michigan House of Representatives
Democratic Party Michigan state senators
People from Warren, Michigan
University of Detroit Mercy alumni
Wayne State University alumni